Nowy Borek  is a village in the administrative district of Gmina Błażowa, within Rzeszów County, Subcarpathian Voivodeship, in southeastern Poland.

References

Nowy Borek